White Bridge is an arch bridge located in Ahvaz, Khuzestan, Iran, built above the Karun river. The bridge was completed on September 21, 1936 and was inaugurated on November 6, 1936. The bridge remains a symbol of the city still today.

References

Ahvaz
Bridges in Iran
Architecture in Iran
Bridges completed in 1936
Suspension bridges in Iran